Bruce Nelson is a Naval Architect who specializes in high-performance yacht design, and who has competed as a sportsman at the upper echelons in his chosen field.

Biography
Nelson is a University of Michigan graduate in Naval Architecture. He won the 1972 Sloop National Championship at college. He has been most notable as a principal yacht designer for the America’s Cup contenders and America One challenge. Nelson is a veteran America's Cup racer as well as designer, he teamed with Dennis Conner on three Stars & Stripes boats (12-meter, catamaran, and IACC) from 1985 to 1995 as both a racer and designer. In 1995, he was the principal designer for the PACT 95 defense syndicate yacht Young America, which was ultimately chosen to be the defender.

Nelson is also an Etchells 22 sailor of some note, having won many local regattas in the San Diego fleet at the National level.

Bruce Nelson and Bruce Marek were the principals of a prolific San Diego California yacht design team, Nelson Marek, formed in 1979. Their first custom design was the incredibly successful One Ton class RUSH. Built in just 72 days, and launched 3 hours before the San Diego Yachting Cup, it lived up to its name. It was the most successful racing yacht in the U.S. in 1980 winning 21 races including the North American One Tons, Chicago Yacht Club Race to Mackinac, Port Huron to Mackinac Boat Race, and Great Lakes champion. Nelson continues to operate Nelson Marek, while Marek is an independent designer on the East Coast. Most of their designs are for custom built yachts including world class racers, although they have designed some production models including the Catalina 42 hull and the Merit 28.

One of the more interesting stories is the Catalina 42, the hull of which was originally designed as a limited production ocean racer. Catalina Yachts which at the time produced mostly smaller yachts  and under, acquired the rights to produce the Nelson-Marek designed hull in the late 1980s. Designer Gerry Douglas modified the hull to accept a higher cabin top and cruiser style cabin—the result was Catalina's largest sized offering for many years, with roughly 1,000 hulls on the water.

America's Cup participation
 1985–1987 – Stars & Stripes 83, Stars & Stripes 85, Stars & Stripes 86, Stars & Stripes 87 (12 m), Dennis Conner
 1988–1990 – Stars & Stripes (catamaran), Dennis Conner
 1991–1992 – Stars & Stripes (IACC), Dennis Conner
 1993–1995 – Young America, PACT 95
 199?–2000 – America One, Paul Cayard

IOR designs

 Crackerjack
 Electra
 Sleeper
 Reliance
 Ragtime
 Cowboy  (NOT an IOR design.  It was a MORC boat.)
 Infinity
 Stars & Stripes
 Rowdy  (NOT a N/M design.  It is a Peterson Designed Contessa 39)
 Lonestar
 Renegade

Producers of Nelson – Marek Designs

 Catalina Yachts
 Martin Yachts Vancouver, BC
 Merit Yachts
 Morgan Yachts
 Salthouse Brothers, New Zealand
 U.S. Watercraft
 W.D. Schock
 Carroll Marine

Production models

 Nelson – Marek 30
 1D 35
 CM 1200
 Nelson – Marek 36
 Nelson – Marek 41
 Nelson – Marek 43
 Nelson – Marek 45
 Nelson - Marek 46
 Nelson Marek 52 Ptarmigan
 Nelson Marek 55 BOLT née Lone Star
 Catalina 42
 Merit 28
 Santana 30/30
 Schock 34 Grand Prix

References
 The Royal Gazette, Bermuda – June 27, 2005. Marion-Bermuda Race Trophies. Includes The Blue Water Sailing Club Board of Governors Trophy awarded to Mameluke, a Nelson Marek 49, skippered by Greg Storer from Annapolis, Maryland
 Sail Magazine
 SAIC Site
 Cruising World Magazine
 Biography Bruce Nelson
 Catalina Timeline
 Good Old Boat magazine: Volume 4, Number 1, January/February 2001
 Heart of GLASS, Fiberglass Boats And The Men Who Made Them by Daniel Spurr

Year of birth missing (living people)
Living people
University of Michigan College of Engineering alumni
American yacht designers
America's Cup yacht designers
Michigan Wolverines sailors